Diuris picta, commonly called the granite bee orchid or granite donkey orchid, is a species of orchid which is endemic to the south-west of Western Australia. It has between three and five leaves at its base and up to eight creamy-white to yellow flowers with brownish purple markings. It grows on granite outcrops between Menzies and Lake King.

Description
Flowering occurs in September and October.

Taxonomy and naming
Diuris picta was first formally described in 1853 by James Drummond and the description was published in Hooker's Journal of Botany and Kew Garden Miscellany. The specific epithet (picta) is a Latin word meaning "coloured" or "painted".

Distribution and habitat
The granite bee orchid grows between Menzies and Lake King in the Avon Wheatbelt, Coolgardie, Mallee and Yalgoo biogeographic regions.

Conservation
Diuris picta is classified as "not threatened" by the Western Australian Government Department of Parks and Wildlife.

References

picta
Endemic orchids of Australia
Orchids of Western Australia
Endemic flora of Western Australia
Plants described in 1853
Taxa named by James Drummond (botanist)